Jozabed Sánchez Ruiz (born 8 March 1991), known simply as Jozabed, is a Spanish professional footballer who plays for Málaga CF as a central midfielder.

Club career

Early years
Born in Mairena del Alcor, Province of Seville, Jozabed finished his youth career with Sevilla FC, and made his senior debut in 2010–11 with the C team. He was promoted to the reserves in the summer of 2012.

On 1 February 2013, Jozabed terminated his contract with the Andalusians and joined SD Ponferradina. He appeared in his first game as a professional eight days later, playing the last 30 minutes in a 3–0 away defeat against Villarreal CF in the Segunda División.

Jozabed returned to his native region on 9 July 2013, signing with Real Jaén also in the second tier. He made his official debut on 18 August, scoring in a 1–2 home loss to SD Eibar.

Rayo Vallecano
On 20 June 2014, after Jaén's relegation, Jozabed moved to La Liga with Rayo Vallecano after agreeing to a three-year deal. He made his debut in the competition on 4 October, coming on as a late substitute in a 0–2 home loss against FC Barcelona.

Jozabed scored his first goal in the Spanish top flight on 4 January 2015, his team's first in a 2–1 win at RCD Espanyol.

Fulham
On 12 August 2016, Jozabed moved abroad for the first time in his career, on a three-year contract with Championship club Fulham for an undisclosed fee. His first match took place four days later, when he replaced Floyd Ayité in a 1–1 draw away to Leeds United.

Celta
On 13 January 2017, Jozabed was loaned to RC Celta de Vigo of the Spanish top division until June. On 4 July, he signed a permanent four-year deal.

On 26 August 2019, after being deemed surplus to requirements by Fran Escribá, Jozabed was loaned to second-tier Girona FC for one year. On 16 September of the following year, he renewed his contract until 2022 and was immediately loaned out to second division side Málaga CF for the season.

Career statistics

References

External links

1991 births
Living people
People from Campiña de Carmona
Sportspeople from the Province of Seville
Spanish footballers
Footballers from Andalusia
Association football midfielders
La Liga players
Segunda División players
Segunda División B players
Tercera División players
Sevilla FC C players
Sevilla Atlético players
SD Ponferradina players
Real Jaén footballers
Rayo Vallecano players
RC Celta de Vigo players
Girona FC players
Málaga CF players
English Football League players
Fulham F.C. players
Spanish expatriate footballers
Spanish expatriate sportspeople in England
Expatriate footballers in England